Barar (also Romanized as Barār) is a village in Birun Bashm Rural District, Kelardasht District, Chalus County, Mazandaran Province, Iran. At the 2006 census, its population was 71, in 22 families.

References 

Populated places in Chalus County